Microchironomus is a genus of European non-biting midges in the subfamily Chironominae of the bloodworm family Chironomidae.

Species
M. deribae (Freeman, 1957)
M. lendli (Kieffer, 1918)
M. nigrovittatus (Malloch, 1915)
M. tener (Kieffer, 1918)

References

Chironomidae
Diptera of Europe
Taxa named by Jean-Jacques Kieffer